Uzbekistan competed in the 15th Asian Games, officially known as the XV Asiad held in Doha, Qatar from December 1 to December 15, 2006. Uzbekistan ranked 7th with 11 gold medals in this edition of the Asiad.

Medal table

References

Nations at the 2006 Asian Games
2006
Asian Games